The men's 200 metre backstroke event at the 2002 Commonwealth Games took place 1 August. The heats and the final were held on 1 August.

Results

Final

Key: WR = World record

Preliminaries

References
Results

Swimming at the 2002 Commonwealth Games